Surendra Singh Nagar  (born 10 May 1965) is an Indian politician and Member of Parliament in Rajya Sabha since July 2016. He was also a Member of Parliament in the 15th Lok Sabha from Gautam Buddha Nagar constituency of Uttar Pradesh as a Bahujan Samaj Party candidate. He was a member of Bahujan Samaj Party from May 2008 to 2014. He joined Samajwadi Party before the Lok Sabha elections in 2014. On 10 August 2019, he joined Bharatiya Janta Party.

Personal life
Surendra Nagar was born on 10 May 1965 in the village of Gulaothi of Bulandshahr district in Uttar Pradesh to Ved Ram Nagar and Dharam Wati Nagar. He holds a B.Com. degree from SSV College in Hapur. He married Rakhi Nagar 02 May 1987, with whom he has two sons and a daughter. By profession, Nagar is an agriculturist and businessman.

Political career
Nagar has been in active politics since 1990s and has held various posts during the years. This is his first term as M.P.

Prior to becoming M.P., Nagar was also a member of Uttar Pradesh Legislative Assembly.

In June 2016, he became a Member of Parliament in Rajya Sabha. He resigned on 2 August 2019.

On 10 August 2019, Nagar joined Bharatiya Janta Party.

Positions held
Surendra Singh Nagar has been elected 1 time as Lok Sabha MP and 3 times as Rajya Sabha MP.

See also

15th Lok Sabha
Politics of India
Parliament of India
Government of India
Bahujan Samaj Party
Gautam Buddha Nagar (Lok Sabha constituency)
Uttar Pradesh Legislative Assembly

References 

|-

India MPs 2009–2014
1965 births
Bharatiya Janata Party politicians from Uttar Pradesh
Lok Sabha members from Uttar Pradesh
People from Bulandshahr district
Living people